Euchromius jaxartella is a moth in the family Crambidae. It was described by Nikolay Grigoryevich Erschoff in 1874. It is found in Transcaucasia, Iran, Tadzhikistan, Kyrgyzstan, Kazakhstan, Afghanistan, Pakistan, Turkmenistan and Mongolia.

References

Crambinae
Moths described in 1874
Moths of Asia